Brian Duffy is a chef known for numerous television appearances on the TV series Bar Rescue.

Biography 

As a chef, Duffy tours the United States, occasionally riding his Harley Davidson, helping and revamping struggling bars and restaurants along the way. Kicking off his television career on the Food Network series "Date Plate", Duffy has also been featured on the DIY Network, HGTV, NBC, and Fine Living Network. He has served as a judge on the Food Network series "Beat Bobby Flay" and has appeared on The Today Show since 2006 for the St. Patrick's Day Irish cook-off.

Duffy developed his signature spice line along with T-shirts, kitchen aprons, hats, and hand soaps specifically fitting the needs of chefs. In 2017, he was initiated into the Tau Kappa Epsilon fraternity.

In 2016, he opened a restaurant in partnership with a local brewing company in the Brewerytown neighborhood in Philadelphia.

References

External links

 Official Site
 

American male chefs
American people of Irish descent
Bar Rescue
Living people
Year of birth missing (living people)